Carlos Fields Jr. (born October 3, 1990) is an American football inside linebacker who is currently a free agent. He played college football for the Winston-Salem State. He signed with the Oakland Raiders as an undrafted free agent in 2014.

Professional career

Oakland Raiders
After going undrafted in the 2014 NFL Draft, Fields signed with the Oakland Raiders on May 16, 2014. He was waived on August 30.

Tampa Bay Buccaneers
On September 1, 2014, Fields signed to the practice squad of the Tampa Bay Buccaneers. He was released on September 30.

New York Giants
Fields signed to the New York Giants' practice squad on October 15, 2014. He was released on October 28.

Indianapolis Colts
The Indianapolis Colts signed Fields to their practice squad on October 29, 2014. Fields signed a futures contract on January 19, 2015. He was waived on September 5.

Washington Redskins
The Washington Redskins signed Fields to their practice squad on November 9, 2015. On December 5, 2015, the Washington Redskins activated Fields to their 53-man roster.

The team waived Fields on September 3, 2016.

Buffalo Bills
On September 6, 2016, Fields was signed to the Buffalo Bills' practice squad. He was released on September 27, 2016.

Second stint with Redskins
On October 19, 2016, Fields signed to the Washington Redskins practice squad. He was released on November 15, 2016.

San Diego/Los Angeles Chargers
On November 21, 2016, Fields was signed to the Chargers' practice squad. He was promoted to the active roster on December 31, 2016. On May 16, 2017, he was released by the Chargers.

Philadelphia Eagles
On August 30, 2017, Fields signed with the Philadelphia Eagles, only to be waived two days later.

References

External links
 Indianapolis Colts bio
 Oakland Raiders bio
 WSSU Rams bio

1990 births
Living people
American football linebackers
Winston-Salem State Rams football players
Oakland Raiders players
Tampa Bay Buccaneers players
New York Giants players
Indianapolis Colts players
Washington Redskins players
Buffalo Bills players
San Diego Chargers players
Los Angeles Chargers players
Philadelphia Eagles players
People from Henderson, North Carolina
Players of American football from North Carolina